The A-League Women Young Footballer of the Year is an annual association football award presented to a player in the Australian A-League Women.

The W-League was established in 2008 as the top tier of women's football in Australia. The award is given to a top-performing young player over the regular season (not including the finals series). The inaugural award was shared by Elise Kellond-Knight of Brisbane Roar and Ellyse Perry of Canberra United.

Ellie Carpenter has won the award three times. Steph Catley won the award twice.

Winners

See also

 List of sports awards honoring women
 W-League Golden Boot
 W-League records and statistics
 Julie Dolan Medal

Notes

References

A-League Women trophies and awards
A-League Women lists
Women's association football trophies and awards
Association football young player of the year awards
Rookie player awards